Kupat Holim Meuhedet (lit. United Sickness Fund), is Israel's third largest health insurance and medical services organization and is one of four state-mandated health funds (Kupot Holim) that Israeli residents must belong to under Israel's universal healthcare framework.

Meuhedet provides coverage and service to more than 1.2 million members in 2020.

The organization was founded in 1974 as the result of a merger (hence the "Union" in its name) of two Kupot Holim: The Common Health Fund (קופת חולים עממית) established in 1931 by Hadassah, and the General Zionists' Health Fund (קופת חולים של הציונים הכלליים) established in 1936. These two predecessor organizations were formed during the prestatal Yishuv period and, like the other health funds in Israel, were modeled after the German medical mutual-aid societies (Krankenkasse) of the late 19th and early 20th century.

In 2005, Meuhedet took over Misgav Ladach hospital in Jerusalem, turning it into a diagnostic center and in 2019 purchased Nara medical which operates several private surgical facilities across Israel.

Meuhedet is headed by Ms. Sigal Regev-Rosenberg סיגל רגב רוזנברגwhich serves as CEO since 2018 and is the first woman to serve as a sick fund head in Israel

Phone: *3833

See also
Health care in Israel

References

External links

Kupat Holim Meuhedet

Health maintenance organizations
Medical and health organizations based in Israel
Organizations established in 1974
1974 establishments in Israel